The 2017 Macau Open was a badminton tournament which took place at Tap Seac Multisport Pavilion Macau in Macau from 7 to 12 November 2017 and had a total purse of $120,000.

Tournament
The 2017 Macau Open Grand Prix Gold was the sixteenth Grand Prix badminton tournament of the 2017 BWF Grand Prix Gold and Grand Prix and also part of the Macau Open championships which has been held since 2006. This tournament was organized by the Badminton Federation of Macau and sanctioned by the BWF.

Venue
This international tournament was held at Tap Seac Multisport Pavilion Macau in Macau.

Point distribution
Below is the tables with the point distribution for each phase of the tournament based on the BWF points system for the Grand Prix Gold event.

Prize money
The total prize money for this year tournament is US$120,000. Distribution of prize money will be in accordance with BWF regulations.

Men's singles

Seeds

 Ng Ka Long Angus (withdrew)
 Wong Wing Ki (quarterfinals)
 Lee Hyun-il (semifinals)
 Hu Yun (first round)
 Hsu Jen-hao (first round)
 Kanta Tsuneyama (quarterfinals)
 Chong Wei Feng (quarterfinals)
 Zhao Junpeng (third round)
 Lin Yu-hsien (second round)
 Zulfadli Zulkiffli (semifinals)
 Liew Daren (second round)
 Wei Nan (first round)
 Lee Cheuk Yiu (second round)
 Ihsan Maulana Mustofa (final)
 Pannawit Thongnuam  (third round)
 Hsueh Hsuan-yi (first round)

Finals

Top half

Section 1

Section 2

Section 3

Section 4

Bottom half

Section 5

Section 6

Section 7

Section 8

Women's singles

Seeds

 Aya Ohori (quarterfinals)
 Cheung Ngan Yi (semifinals)
 Saena Kawakami (first round)
 Fitriani (second round)
 Yip Pui Yin (first round)
 Evgeniya Kosetskaya (second round)
 Haruko Suzuki (second round)
 Chen Su-yu (quarterfinals)

Finals

Top half

Section 1

Section 2

Bottom half

Section 3

Section 4

Men's doubles

Seeds

 Lee Jhe-huei / Lee Yang (semifinals)
 Vladimir Ivanov / Ivan Sozonov (withdrew)
 Takuto Inoue / Yuki Kaneko (quarterfinals)
 Liao Min-chun / Su Cheng-heng (quarterfinals)
 Law Cheuk Him / Lee Chun Hei (first round)
 Or Chin Chung / Tang Chun Man (semifinals)
 Goh Sze Fei / Nur Izzuddin (withdrew)
 Chung Eui-seok / Kim Duk-young (second round)

Finals

Top half

Section 1

Section 2

Bottom half

Section 3

Section 4

Women's doubles

Seeds

 Vivian Hoo Kah Mun / Woon Khe Wei (withdrew)
 Anggia Shitta Awanda / Ni Ketut Mahadewi Istirani (quarterfinals)
 Hsu Ya-ching / Wu Ti-jung (second round)
 Lim Yin Loo / Yap Cheng Wen (second round)
 Huang Dongping / Jia Yifan (withdrew)
 Kim Hye-rin / Lee So-hee (second round)
 Kim So-yeong / Kong Hee-yong (semifinals)
 Huang Yaqiong / Yu Xiaohan (champion)

Finals

Top half

Section 1

Section 2

Bottom half

Section 3

Section 4

Mixed doubles

Seeds

 Lee Chun Hei / Chau Hoi Wah (semifinals)
 Tang Chun Man / Tse Ying Suet (quarterfinals)
 Terry Hee Yong Kai / Tan Wei Han (quarterfinals)
 Evgenij Dremin / Evgenia Dimova (first round) 
 Zheng Siwei / Huang Yaqiong (champion)
 Seo Seung-jae / Kim Ha-na (final)
 Han Chengkai / Tang Jinhua (quarterfinals)
 Chan Peng Soon / Cheah Yee See (semifinals)

Finals

Top half

Section 1

Section 2

Bottom half

Section 3

Section 4

References

External links
 Official site
 Tournament Link

Macau Open Badminton Championships
Macau Open
Open Grand Prix Gold
Macau Open Grand Prix Gold